Borshchiv Raion (translit. Borschivs’kyi raion) was a raion (a district within Ternopil Oblast (province) in western Ukraine, an area known as Galicia. The administrative center of the raion was Borshchiv. The raion was abolished on 18 July 2020 as part of the administrative reform of Ukraine, which reduced the number of raions of Ternopil Oblast to three. The area of Borshchiv Raion was merged into Chortkiv Raion. The last estimate of the raion population was

Subdivisions
At the time of disestablishment, the raion consisted of five hromadas:
 Bilche-Zolote rural hromada with the administration in the selo of Bilche-Zolote;
 Borshchiv urban hromada with the administration in Borshchiv;
 Ivane-Puste rural hromada with the administration in the selo of Ivane-Puste;
 Melnytsia-Podilska settlement hromada with the administration in the urban-type settlement of Melnytsia-Podilska;
 Skala-Podilska settlement hromada with the administration in the urban-type settlement of Skala-Podilska.

Demographics
Of this, 19,621 were urban inhabitants (mostly concentrated in Borshchiv).

Geography

The territory of Borshchiv raion was 1,006 square kilometers (100,600 hectares).

Villages

There were 70 villages (selo) within the raion, 2 urban-type settlements and one city (misto) - Borshchiv. The major villages in Borshchiv district included:

Names are given in Ukrainian followed by Polish and Russian names in brackets. Some of the villages listed below (those located to the southeast of Borshchiv), belonged administratively to the bordering Zalishchyky Raion.

Babyntsi (Babińce / Babintsy) — 18 km south of Borshchiv. The name derives from the Ukrainian word "baba" (grandmother, woman). It was an old Rus fortified settlement with ramparts around it, which are preserved.
Bedrykivtsi (Bedrykowce / Bedrikovtsy) — Is 34 km southwest of Borshchiv, in the Zalishchyky district, only 10 km north from Zalishchyky, on a minor river which is a tributary of the Seret / Dniester. The name derives from the Ukrainian word "bedro" (rib). The village is very old; it had a prehistoric settlement. It also has an old graveyard.
Bilche-Zolote (Bilcze Złote / Bilche Zolotoye) — A village with a park of 1800 hectares (4448 acres) of which 11 hectares (27 acres) are planted with 400-year-old trees. The village is known for a significant Neolithic Cucuteni-Trypillian culture archaeological site dating back to the 4th millennium B.C., a small palace, and the large gypsum karst Verteba Cave, which was used in World War II as a hiding place for Ukrainian Jews who fled the Nazis during The Holocaust in Ukraine, a story that was featured in the June/July 2004 issue of the National Geographic Adventure Magazine, as well as numerous other journal articles.
Burdyakivtsi (Burdiakowce / Burdyakovtsy) — Is 15 km northeast of Borshchiv. It is not far from the Zbruch river.
Dzvenyhorod (Dźwinogród / Dzvenigorod) — Has an Assumption Church (Uspenska tserkva) with belfry. It is located on the slope of a mountain next to the Dniester (Dnister) river. The church dates from 1801 but the western part was reconstructed in 1861. The village is located in the southern part of the Borshchiv district, on the bank of the Dniester river (during 1920–1939 when Dzvenyhorod was part of Poland, the river Dniester was the border between Poland and Romania's Bukovina).
Hermakivka (Germakówka / Germakovka) is a small village, located 20 km southeast of Borshchiv, 5 km west of the river Zbruch. The Zbruch was the border between the Austrian and Russian empires during 1772–1918. (Hermakivka was on the Austrian side of the river). What is remarkable about Hermakivka is that there is a Trayan wall (Wal Trajana in Polish and Trajaniv Val in Ukrainian), south of the village. It stretches from Hermakivka south via Zalissya and Kdryntis to the river Dniester. The Trayan wall was built by the Romans (under the emperor Trajan), as the northeastern border of the Roman Empire (province of Dacia).
Holihrady, Goligrady (Holihrady / Gologrady) is located on the left bank of the Seret river, 23 km southwest of Borshchiv. The village has an old stone church and a fabulous cave.
Horodok (Gródek / Gorodok) is a village on the isthmus of the Seret and Dniester rivers, 33 km southeast of Borshchiv, not far from the town of Zalishchyky. Note that there is major town with the same name in the Lviv region of Western Ukraine. The name literally means "little town". It had an old pre-historical settlement and a burial ground was also discovered here.
Ivane-Puste (Iwanie Puste / Ivana Pustoye) has the wooden church of St John with a belfry. The church dates from 1775 (Polish kingdom times, two years before Ivane-Puste came under Austrian rule) and is a monument to the old Podolian school of people's architecture.
Kapustyntsi (Kapuścińce / Kapustintsy) — Is a village 22 km northwest of Borshchiv, on the left bank of the river Seret. The name comes from the Slavic root "Kapusta" (cabbage). There used to be a Rus settlement here and there was also a medieval town.
Kasparivtsi (Kasparowce / Kasparovtsy) — is 30 km southwest of Borshchiv, on the river Seret. Many old coins have been found in this village. It has an eighteenth-century stone church.
Korolivka (Korolówka / Korolevka) — Is 10 km south of Borshchiv. Korolivka boasts a palace and cave.
Kryvche (Krzywcze / Krivche). Kryvche is known mainly because of its cave system, one of the longest in the world. It is also known for Kryvche castle which dates from first half of the 17th century and is built of sandstone, representing a typical castle from that period.
Kudryntsi (Kudryńce / Kudrintsy) also boasts a 17th-century castle. This one is located on the plateau of a steep mountain over the river Zbruch. This river was the border between the Austrian and Russian empires. Kudryntsi was on the right bank of Zbruch, i.e. the Austrian side). The original wójts of this region were of the noble house Kudrycki z Kudrynce h. Labedz i.e. Herb Labedz; from the period predating the Polish Lithuanian Commonwealth, probably of the Grand Duchy of Lithuania. The castle was fortified about 1386 following the Kreva agreement. Legend has it the castle is linked with Kryvche via underground sandstone caves. This castle fortress is also built of sandstone, but it is non-regular in plan and has three corner towers. It was reconstructed in the 18th century. The Trayan Wall passes through Kudryntsi (from Hermakivka via Zalissya and Kudryntsi south to the river Dniester). This wall was built by the Roman emperor Trajan, and served as the north-eastern border of the Roman Empire.
Kulakivtsi (Kułakowce / Kulakovtsy) — Is 32 km southwest of Borshchiv, on the isthmus of the rivers Dniester and Seret. The name comes from the Slavic word "kulak" (fist). The village has a 19th-century wooden church.
Lanivtsi (Łanowce / Lanovtsy) — Is a village 5 km northwest of Borshchiv. It has the remains of an old fortified settlement.
Okopy

See also
 Borshchiv Ghetto
 Subdivisions of Ukraine

References

External links

Former raions of Ternopil Oblast
1940 establishments in Ukraine
Ukrainian raions abolished during the 2020 administrative reform